Kah Rural District is a rural district (dehestan) in Central, Davarzan County, Razavi Khorasan Province, Iran. At the 2006 census, its population (including villages split off to form Mehr Rural District) was 8,531, in 2,550 families; excluding those villages, the population (as of 2006) was 4,019, in 1,245 families.  The rural district has 9 villages; eight villages noted in 2006 were re-assigned to Mehr Rural District.

References 

Rural Districts of Razavi Khorasan Province
Davarzan County